Brian E. O'Neil (1921-1985) was an American philosopher and a professor of philosophy at the University of New Mexico. He was known for his research on Descartes' philosophy. O'Neil died from cancer in 1985.

Books
 Epistemological Direct Realism in Descartes' Philosophy,  University of New Mexico Press (1974)

References

20th-century American philosophers
Descartes scholars
Philosophy academics
1985 deaths
University of California, Berkeley alumni
Date of birth missing
Year of birth missing
Place of birth missing
Date of death missing
Place of death missing
University of New Mexico faculty